Šmarje is a settlement in the hills southwest of Ajdovščina in the Littoral region of Slovenia. As well as the main village of Šmarje, it includes three smaller hamlets: Potok, Hrastje, and Jakulini.

The parish church, from which the settlement gets its name, is dedicated to the Holy Name of Mary and belongs to the Koper Diocese.

References

External links 

Šmarje at Geopedia

Populated places in the Municipality of Ajdovščina